Alexis is an unincorporated community and census-designated place (CDP) in Gaston County, North Carolina, United States.  It is located approximately three miles north of Stanley. It was first listed as a CDP in the 2020 census with a population of 589.

Alexis was incorporated in 1899.  Alexis was formerly named Alex's Cross Roads, for an individual named Alexander who owned land in the area.

The community is in Gaston County, but official residents of the community (by zip code) live in both Gaston and Lincoln counties.  The zip code for Alexis is 28006.

Demographics

2020 census

Note: the US Census treats Hispanic/Latino as an ethnic category. This table excludes Latinos from the racial categories and assigns them to a separate category. Hispanics/Latinos can be of any race.

References

Unincorporated communities in North Carolina
Unincorporated communities in Gaston County, North Carolina
Populated places established in 1899 
Census-designated places in Gaston County, North Carolina